Maynard Clayton MacAskill (born November 17, 1938) is a Canadian politician. He represented the electoral district of Victoria in the Nova Scotia House of Assembly from 1974 to 1978. He is a member of the Nova Scotia Liberal Party.

MacAskill was born in Breton Cove, Nova Scotia. He attended Acadia University, Dalhousie University, and the University of Alberta, earning B.Sc., M.D., and M.H.S.A. (Master of Health Services Administration) degrees. He was a health care administrator.

MacAskill entered provincial politics in the 1974 election, defeating incumbent Fisher Husdon in the Victoria riding. He served in the Executive Council of Nova Scotia as Minister of Consumer Affairs, Minister of Education, and Minister of Health. MacAskill retired from politics prior to the 1978 election.

References

Living people
1938 births
Nova Scotia Liberal Party MLAs
Members of the Executive Council of Nova Scotia
People from Victoria County, Nova Scotia
Acadia University alumni
Dalhousie University alumni
University of Alberta alumni
Nova Scotia Ministers of Health